This is a list of members of the 18th Bundestag – the lower house of parliament of the Federal Republic of Germany, whose members were in office from 22 September 2013 until 24 October 2017.

Members

See also 
 Politics of Germany
 List of Bundestag Members

References

External links
List of biographies of all members of the 18th Bundestag at Bundestag website (in German)

18